Uno scandalo perbene (internationally released as A Proper Scandal) is a 1984 Italian drama film. It represents the last film written and directed by Pasquale Festa Campanile.  It is a true dramatization of the Bruneri-Canella case.

The film entered the competition at the 41° Venice International Film Festival.

Cast 
 Ben Gazzara as Bruneri/Canella
 Giuliana De Sio as Giulia Canella
 Vittorio Caprioli as Renzo 
 Franco Fabrizi as Count Guarienti 
 Valeria D'Obici as Camilla Ghidini 
 Giuliana Calandra as Maria Gastaldelli 
 Vincenzo Crocitti as The Journalist
 Enzo Robutti as  The Professor 
 Carlos de Carvalho  as Count De Besi
 Clara Colosimo  as Tenutaria

References

External links

1984 films
Italian drama films
Italian films based on actual events
Films directed by Pasquale Festa Campanile
Films about amnesia
1980s Italian-language films
1980s Italian films